This is a list of museums in Brussels, Belgium.

It includes museums situated in any of the municipalities of the Brussels-Capital Region.

Former museums
 Underwear Museum - Moved to Lessines, Hainaut in 2016
 Scientastic Museum - Closed in 2012
 Charles Debuer Fencing Museum - Closed
 NAM-IP Computer Museum - Collection moved to Namur, Wallonia in 2015
 Museum of Letters and Manuscripts in Brussels - Closed

References

External links
 
 Official site of the Brussels council of museums

 
Brussels
Museums in Brussels
Museums
Museums in Brussels